Melbury may refer to:

Dorset, England
Melbury Abbas, village and civil parish in north Dorset, between Shaftesbury and Blandford Forum on the edge of Cranborne Chase
Melbury Bubb, small village and civil parish in Dorset, approximately 7 miles south of the town of Sherborne
Melbury Down, area of downland in northern Dorset
Melbury Hill and summit Melbury Beacon is a prominent hill, 263 metres high, on the North Dorset Downs above the village of Melbury Abbas
Melbury House in Melbury Sampford near Evershot, Dorset, the seat of the Strangways family of Dorset since 1500
Melbury Osmond, village and civil parish in the county of Dorset in southern England

Melbury Road, Holland Park, London
29 Melbury Road, or The Tower House, a late-Victorian townhouse built by the architect and designer William Burges as his home
2b Melbury Road, Grade II listed house built in 1877 by Sir John Belcher
31 Melbury Road, or Woodland House, Queen Anne-style House by architect Richard Norman Shaw
8 Melbury Road, Queen Anne-style house by architect Richard Norman Shaw

Fiction
Melbury, a fictional London suburb in Random Harvest, a novel by James Hilton
A small village in the novel The vanishing point, by Patricia Wentworth (1953)
Lord Melbury, a character in "A Touch of Class", a 1975 episode of BBC sitcom Fawlty Towers

See also
Melby (disambiguation)